Yuva is a 2004 Indian political film.

Yuva may also refer to:

 Yuva, Aksaray, a village in the district of Aksaray, Aksaray Province, Turkey
 Yuva, Bolu, a village in the district of Bolu, Bolu Province, Turkey
 Yuva, Çubuk, a village in the district of Çubuk, Ankara Province, Turkey
 Yuva, Orta
 Yuva, Seben
 Yuva, Silvan
 The former name of Shahumyan, Ararat, a town in Ararat Province, Armenia